"Sun Is Shining" is a song by Jamaican reggae band Bob Marley & the Wailers, first appearing on the Lee Perry-produced album Soul Revolution Part II in 1971, and then on African Herbsman in 1973. Marley later re-recorded the song for his 1978 album Kaya. In 1999, a remix by "Bob Marley vs. Funkstar De Luxe" reached number one on the US Hot Dance Music/Club Play chart and number three on the UK Singles Chart.

Although having become one of the most popular Marley songs, "Sun Is Shining" used to be a fairly unknown and seldom-performed number during Marley's lifetime. Up to date, only two live performances are documented; however, both took place under special circumstances. On 16 June 1978, Marley performed at The Music Inn in Lenox, Massachusetts, a concert having been rescheduled twice since 1976, and played an over 2-hour set. "Sun Is Shining" was the opening song, reportedly included spontaneously as it stopped to rain. On 23 July 1978, Marley performed an outdoor concert at the Santa Barbara Bowl that included "Sun Is Shining" as opening song; just before the song, Marley introduced the performance by referring to Haile Selassie's birthday on the same day.

Bob Marley vs. Funkstar De Luxe version

The song was remixed in 1999 by Danish house music producer Funkstar De Luxe. It was released on the Kontor Records-sub label Club Tools, credited to Bob Marley vs. Funkstar De Luxe. The producer was the first to receive clearance from the Marley estate to release official remixes of the late singer's music (although bootleg mixes of Marley tunes have circulated in the club world for years).

The song reached number one in Iceland and on the American and Canadian dance charts, and it debuted at number three on the UK Singles Chart—Marley's highest-charting single in that country. It also became a top-10 hit in Belgium, Finland, Ireland, Norway and Switzerland.

Track listing
 "Sun Is Shining" (Radio De Luxe edit)	– 3:59
 "Sun Is Shining" (ATB airplay mix) – 3:48
 "Sun Is Shining" (Rainbow mix) – 6:03
 "Sun Is Shining" (ATB club mix) – 6:55
 "Sun Is Shining" (Funkstar club mix) – 8:14
 "Sun Is Shining" (Firebeatz remix) – 3:28

Charts

Weekly charts

Year-end charts

Certifications

References

1971 songs
1999 singles
Bob Marley songs
Electronic dance music songs
Number-one singles in Iceland
Songs about weather
Songs written by Bob Marley
UK Independent Singles Chart number-one singles